5β-Reductase, or Δ4-3-oxosteroid 5β-reductase (3-oxo-Δ4-steroid 5β-reductase, androstenedione 5β-reductase, cholestenone 5β-reductase, cortisone 5β-reductase, cortisone Δ4-5β-reductase, steroid 5β-reductase, testosterone 5β-reductase, Δ4-3-ketosteroid 5β-reductase, Δ4-5β-reductase, Δ4-hydrogenase, 4,5β-dihydrocortisone:NADP+ Δ4-oxidoreductase, 3-oxo-5β-steroid:NADP+ Δ4-oxidoreductase) is an enzyme with systematic name 5β-cholestan-3-one:NADP+ 4,5-oxidoreductase. This enzyme catalyses the following chemical reaction

 (1) 5β-cholestan-3-one + NADP+  cholest-4-en-3-one + NADPH + H+
 (2) 17,21-dihydroxy-5β-pregnane-3,11,20-trione + NADP+  cortisone + NADPH + H+

The human enzyme efficiently acts on progesterone, 17α-hydroxyprogesterone, androstenedione, and testosterone to 5β-reduced metabolites. It can also act on aldosterone, corticosterone and cortisol, to some extent.

See also 
 5α-Reductase
 Steroidogenic enzyme

References

External links 
 

EC 1.3.1